The Girls and Daddy is a 1909 American silent short drama film directed by D. W. Griffith with Griffith appearing in a small blackface role. A print of the film exists in the film archive of the Library of Congress.

Cast
 David Miles as Dr. Payson
 Florence Lawrence as Dr. Payson's First Daughter
 Dorothy West as Dr. Payson's Second Daughter
 Florence Barker
 Dorothy Bernard
 Clara T. Bracy
 Kate Bruce
 John R. Cumpson as At Black & Tan Ball
 Gladys Egan
 Charles Gorman
 D. W. Griffith as At Black & Tan Ball
 Robert Harron as Messenger
 Anita Hendrie as In Post Office
 Charles Inslee as Burglar
 Arthur V. Johnson as At Black & Tan Ball / Policeman
 Marion Leonard as At Black & Tan Ball
 Wilfred Lucas
 Gertrude Robinson as On Street
 Mack Sennett as At Black & Tan Ball / Policeman
 Harry Solter

References

External links
 
 A clip of the film available for free download at Internet Archive

1909 films
1909 drama films
Silent American drama films
American silent short films
American black-and-white films
Films directed by D. W. Griffith
1909 short films
1900s American films